Japanese Castles in Korea are Japanese castles built along the southern shores of Korea during Japanese invasions of Korea between 1592 and 1598 by the Japanese military.

Japanese castles in Korea can be classified into two categories: castles that were built to secure supply lines for Japanese forces moving throughout Korea, and castles that were built mainly along the southern coast of Korea to act as seats of governing power.

The first category of castles were built between Busan and Seoul at intervals roughly equal to the distance an army could march in one day. The castle network was later expanded northward to Uiju. These castles were established by either reinforcing existing settlements, or were built anew if no suitable settlements existed in the area where a castle was needed. Although the locations are currently unknown, Japanese castles are also believed to have been built between Kilju and Anbyŏn in the historical Hamgyong Province.

The second category of castles built along the southern coast of Korea were located in Busan, Ulsan, South Gyeongsang Province, Suncheon, South Jeolla Province).

Japanese castles are thought to have been built not only on the southern coast of the Korean Peninsula but also in the inland areas, but the reality is unknown. Thirty-two areas on the southern coast have already been investigated.

Research 
Na Dong-wook, head of the Cultural Heritage Research Team at the Busan Museum, summarized the research results of the Japanese Fortress built during the Imjin War and the Jeongyu War.

Team leader Na introduced the fact that Ulsan Japanese Fortress, which was built by 16,000 Japanese soldiers for 40 days in 1597, was a highly defensive castle, pointing out that about 30 Japanese Fortresses in Korea are being damaged by development and environmental changes.

"The Japanese Fortress is an important cultural asset in reconstructing the East Asian War and recreating history that was fierce more than 400 years ago," he stressed.

The academic symposium, co-hosted by the National Museum of Korea and sponsored by KEB Hana Bank and the Korean Culture and Arts Committee, was organized in conjunction with the special exhibition "Jeong Yu-jae-ran," which runs until the 22nd. There will also be presentations on strengthening negotiations, the outbreak of the oil crisis, the direction of understanding of the Battle of Noryang, and the Battle of Yukinaga and Suncheon Castle in Konishi.

"We look forward to an in-depth discussion on the oil refinery disaster through this symposium," said an official at the Jinju National Museum. "It will be a place to take a detailed look at the lives and lives of the Korean, Chinese and Japanese people as well as the reality of the war."

The purpose of oil refining is to conquer the southern part of the Korean Peninsula... all Koreans are arrested.

Cultural Heritage Protection Act 
 Cultural Heritage
The Japanese Fortress is protected by the Cultural Heritage Protection Act, just like the Korean castle. It is preserved by the Cultural Heritage Administration of Korea under the Cultural Heritage Protection Act.
 Historically and culturally, Japanese Fortress must be preserved and can be designated as natural reserves and environmental reserves. Talks that Japan's remnants should be eliminated could violate the Cultural Heritage Protection Act.

The Japanese Fortress should be preserved as the site of its history, and excavation surveys related to the Uiseong site (Gupo Japanese Fortress, Jeungsan-ri Fortress in Yangsan) are also needed, he said. (History's Black Box 'Japanese Fortress Rediscovery')

As a cultural asset, much attention is needed historically, and efforts are needed to manage and preserve the Japanese Fortress at the management level so that it is not lost."Definition of Article 2 of the Cultural Heritage Protection Act.
 The Japanese Fortress is recalled under the Cultural Heritage Protection Act as it applies the same protection law as the Korean castle.
 Specifies that property damage may be legally punished for burning, destroying, damaging or destroying a Japanese Fortress without consultation for no reason.

Other 
In 2019, a map of Japanese castle locations, called "Joseon Japanese Illustration," was discovered and became a topic of conversation

 Dadaeposeong Fortress, which was rebuilt during the Japanese Invasion of Korea in 1592, did not become a Japanese fortress like Busanjinseong Fortress or Jaseong Fortress, and Dadaeposeong Fortress was excluded from the Japanese Fortress.
 Jisepojinseong said that the Japanese army led by Kato Kiyomasa lost the battle during the Japanese Invasion of Korea, but the Jiseopseong Fortress was later renamed Jiseposeong Fortress, but was excluded from the Japanese Fortress.
 The Jinju Mangjin Waeseong Fortress was built during the reign of Jeongyujae-ran War and is currently a lost Waeseong Fortress in Bakmungu. There is no wooden fence near the beacon, and the estimated wall at the top was the 5th Gyeongsang Mangjin Mountain Beacon Station 
 The Jinju Mangjin Japanese Fortress was located in Mangjin Mountain, Juyak-dong, Jinju-si, Gyeongsangnam-do. Meanwhile, it is estimated that the 5th Gyeongsang Mangjin Mountain Beacon Station, located 240 meters from the top, was used by the Japanese military during the Japanese Invasion of Korea.
 On September 21, 1598, the Mangjin Japanese Fortress in the Namgang River was burnt down and disappeared.
On the other hand, the Yeongchun Japanese Fortress and Gonyang Japanese Fortress, which are not recorded in the records, were occupied by the forces of Shimazu Yoshihiro in the Battle of Sacheonseong Fortress.
 The next day, on September 22, 1598, Gonyang Waeseong was burned to the ground.
The missing Japanese fortresses were identified as seven sites (Jungang-dong, Dongsam-dong (Busan), Hopo (Yangsan), Gyeonnae-ryang (Geoje), Mangjin, Yeongchun (Jinju), Gonyang (Sacheon), and Dongnae (Busan) will soon be destroyed if they are not managed by the National, Government, Public Office, and Community Center.

Language edition documents 
  :ja:倭城
  :ko:왜성 (건축)
  :fr:Châteaux japonais en Corée
  :zh:倭城

List of Japanese castles in Korea 
Shows a list of Japanese castles (approximately from north to north).

Japanese Invasion of Korea (1592 ~ 1598) 
 In April 1592 shortly after the start of the Japanese invasions of Korea, the Japanese army that landed in Busan built a castle there to establish a supply base. In November of the same year, the Konishi army that occupied Pyongyang built the castle there, and Ukiota built the castle in Namsan. In January of the following year, the Japanese army built about 20 Waseongs on the coast of South Gyeongsang Province today from May 1593.

Japanese Invasion of Korea (1597 ~ 1598) 
 The Japanese army, which had been re-invading after the peace negotiations between the Japanese and Keicho broke down, took over the castle that had been built up until now, and the Japanese navy took over the Kumakawa castle and used it as a base. At that time, the Japanese military secured the occupied land and repaired the traditional coastal area to connect with the Japanese mainland, while the line of battle expanded to Ulsan in the east and Suncheon in the west, and the castle was newly built in this area.
 After the collapse of the negotiations on strengthening the Japanese Invasion of Korea in 1592, the Japanese army occupied the Japanese fortress again, and the Japanese navy occupied Ungcheon Japanese Fortress as its base. At that time, the Japanese army secured the occupied area and repaired the existing Japanese fortress along the coast to connect with the Japanese mainland, and the Japanese fortress was newly built in this area as the front line expanded to Ulsan on the east and Suncheon on the west.

Command Post 
 The Japanese army, which landed in Busan shortly after the start of the Japanese invasion of Korea in April 1592, built the fortress to establish a supply base. In November of the same year, Konishi County, which occupied Pyongyang, built a dwarf planet in Pyongyang, while Ukida built a dwarf planet in Namsan, just south of Hanseong. However, the Japanese army, which began to be chased by the Cho-Myong coalition forces in January of the following year, built some 20 dwarfs along the coast of what is now South Gyeongsang Province from May 1593.
 The Japanese army, which had invaded again after the collapse of negotiations to strengthen the Japanese invasion of Korea, occupied the previously built dwarf planet and made the Japanese army its base by occupying the Ungcheon dwarf. At that time, the Japanese military secured the occupied area and repaired the previously built coastal dwarfs for connection with the mainland Japan, while the front was extended to Ulsan on the east and Suncheon on the west.

Congregation and defense Commander

Gallery

See also 
 List of fortresses in Korea
 Korean-style fortresses in Japan

References 

 
 
16th century in Korea